The 2016 Intrust Super Cup was the PNG Hunters third season in the Queensland Cup.

Season Summary

2016 squad

Squad movement

Gains

Losses

References

2016 in Papua New Guinea rugby league
2016 in rugby league by club
Papua New Guinea Hunters